Axworthy is a surname. Notable people with the name include:
Chris Axworthy  (born 1947), Canadian politician
Lloyd Axworthy (born 1939), Canadian politician, statesman and academic
Michael Axworthy (1962-2019), British academic, author and commentator
Sally Axworthy (born 1964), British diplomat
Tom Axworthy (born 1947), Canadian civil servant, political strategist, writer and professor